Tricerro (Trisser in Piedmontese) is a comune (municipality) in the Province of Vercelli in the Italian region Piedmont, located about  northeast of Turin and about  southwest of Vercelli.

Tricerro borders the following municipalities: Costanzana, Desana, Ronsecco, and Trino.

References

Cities and towns in Piedmont